James Auchterlonie Munro (20 May 1905 – 1978) was a Scottish professional footballer who played as a forward.

Career
Born in Glasgow, Munro developed a reputation as a prolific goalscorer while playing for St Johnstone, scoring 29 goals in 36 Scottish Division One games in 1926–27 which remains a club record and was only his second season as a senior. During his time with the Perth club, he was selected in a Scottish Football Association XI that travelled to Canada in 1927. In February 1929, Munro signed for Cardiff City as a replacement for Hughie Ferguson but was unable to replicate his form in the Football League. He was allowed to join Millwall soon after but struggled to break into the first team before returning to St Johnstone.

References

1905 births
1978 deaths
Scottish footballers
People from Maryhill
Footballers from Glasgow
St Johnstone F.C. players
Raith Rovers F.C. players
Cardiff City F.C. players
Millwall F.C. players
Scottish Football League players
English Football League players
Association football forwards